Mahuva is one of the 182 Legislative Assembly constituencies of Gujarat state in India. It is part of Bhavnagar district.

Segments
This assembly seat represents the following segments

 Mahuva Taluka (Part) Villages - Goras, Kinkaria, Mota Asrana, Chaddika, Bambhaniya, Dudhala No.2, Sanganiya, Kumbhan,
Konjali, Tared, Ratol, Kantasar, Chokva, Moti Sodvadri, Nani Sodvadri, Khatsura, Otha, Lilvan, Nani Jagdhar, Raniwada,
Ranparda, Rohisa, Boda, Bhadrod, Talgajarada, Bhanavav, Rupavati, Lakhupara, Bhadra, Lusadi, Gundarani, Nana Jadra, Tavida, Taredi, Malvav, Katakda, Bhatakda, Uncha Nicha Kotda,
Dayal, Kalsar, Valavav, Sathara, Vaghnagar, Vadli, Umaniyavadar, Nesvad, Haripara, Visavadar, Dundas, Mota Pipalva, Kankot, Nana Pipalva, Bildi, Amrutvel, Bhanvad, Mota
Jadra, Maliya, Naip, Nikol, Devaliya, Dudhala No.1, Madhiya, Vangar, Padhiyarka, Doliya, Dudheri, Gujarda, Khared, Gadhada,
Mahuva (M), Katpar (CT)
 Rajula Taluka (Part) of Amreli District Village - Rampara No-1

Members of Legislative Assembly

Election results

2022 
 

-->

2017

2012

See also
 List of constituencies of Gujarat Legislative Assembly
 Gujarat Legislative Assembly

References

External links
 

Assembly constituencies of Gujarat
Bhavnagar district